Khan Yunis (also spelled Khan Younis or Khan Yunus; translation: Caravansary [of] Jonah) is a city in the southern Gaza Strip. According to the Palestinian Central Bureau of Statistics, Khan Yunis had a population of 142,637 in 2007 and 202,000 in 2010 and 350,000 in 2012.

The Constituency of Khan Yunis had five members on the Palestinian Legislative Council. Following the 2006 Palestinian legislative election, there were three Hamas members, including Yunis al-Astal; and two Fatah members, including Mohammed Dahlan. The city is now under the Hamas administration of Gaza.

History

Establishment by Mamluks
Before the 14th century, Khan Yunis was a village known as "Salqah." To protect caravans, pilgrims and travelers a vast caravan serai was constructed there by the emir Yunus al-Noorzai Khan in 1387–88, a Norzai tribe Afghan ruler in ottoman Empire. The growing town surrounding it was named "Khan Yunis" after him. In 1389 Yunus was killed in battle.  Yunus ibn Abdallah an-Noorzai ad-Dawadar was the executive secretary, one of the high-ranking officials of the Mamluk sultan Barquq. The town became an important center for trade and its weekly Thursday market drew traders from neighboring regions.

The khan served as resting stop for couriers of the barid, the Mamluk postal network in Palestine and Syria.

Ottoman period
In late 1516 Khan Yunis was the site of a minor battle in which the Egypt-based Mamluks were defeated by Ottoman forces under the leadership of Sinan Pasha. The Ottoman sultan Selim I then arrived in the area where he led the Ottoman army across the Sinai Peninsula to conquer Egypt.

During the 17th and 18th centuries the Ottomans assigned an Azeban garrison associated with the Cairo Citadel to guard the fortress at Khan Yunis. Pierre Jacotin named the village Kan Jounes on his map from 1799, while in 1838, Robinson noted Khan Yunas as a Muslim village located in the Gaza district.

In 1863 French explorer Victor Guérin  visited Khan Yunis. He found it had about a thousand inhabitants, and that many fruit trees, especially apricots were planted in the vicinity.

At the end of the 19th-century the Ottomans established a municipal council to administer the affairs of Khan Yunis, which had become the second largest town in the Gaza District after Gaza itself.

British Mandate
In the 1922 census of Palestine conducted by the British Mandate authorities,  Khan Yunis had a population of 3890 inhabitants; one Jew, 23 Christians and 3866 Muslims, decreasing in the 1931 census to 3811,  in 717 houses in the urban area and 3440 in 566 houses in the suburbs.

In the 1945 statistics  Khan Yunis had a population of 11,220, 11,180 Muslims and 40 Christians,  with 2,302 (urban) and 53,820 (rural) dunams of land, according to an official land and population survey. Of this, 4,172 dunams were plantations and irrigable land, 23,656 used for cereals, while 1,847 dunams were built-up land.

During the Nazi occupation of the Dodecanese, many Greeks from Dodecanese islands such as Kastelorizo sought refuge in the nearby Nuseirat camp.

1948–1967
During the night of 31 August 1955, three Israeli paratroop companies attacked the British-built Tegart fort in Khan Yunis from where attacks had been carried out against Israelis. The police station, a petrol station and several buildings in the village of Abasan were destroyed, as well as railway tracks and telegraph poles. In heavy fighting, 72 Egyptian soldiers were killed. One Israeli soldier was killed and 17 were wounded. The operation led to a ceasefire on September 4, forcing President Gamal Abdel Nasser and the Egyptian government to halt Palestinian fedayeen operations against Israel. One of the mechanized companies was commanded by Rafael Eitan.

Before the Suez War, Khan Yunis was officially administered by the All-Palestine Government, seated in Gaza and later in Cairo. After a fierce firefight, the Sherman tanks of the IDF 37th Armored Brigade broke through the heavily fortified lines outside of Khan Yunis held by the 86th Palestinian Brigade. It was the only site in the Gaza strip where the Egyptian army put up any resistance to the Israeli invasion of Gaza, but it surrendered on 3 November 1956.

There are conflicting reports of what happened. Israel said that Palestinians were killed when Israeli forces were still facing armed resistance, while the Palestinians said all resistance had ceased by then, and that many unarmed civilians were killed as the Israel troops went through the town and camp, seeking men in possession of arms.

The killings, dubbed the Khan Yunis massacre, were reported to the UN General Assembly on 15 December 1956 by the Director of the United Nations Relief and Works Agency, Henry Labouisse. According to the report, the exact number of dead and wounded is not known, but the director received lists of names of persons allegedly killed from a trustworthy source, including 275 people, of which 140 were refugees and 135 local residents.

After 1959, the All-Palestine Government of Gaza Strip was abolished and the city was included in the United Arab Republic, which was shortly disestablished and the Gaza Strip came under the direct Egyptian military occupation rule.

1967 and aftermath

In 1967, during the Six-Day War, Israel occupied Khan Yunis again.

Khan Yunis was the site of Israeli helicopter attacks in August 2001 and October 2002 that left several civilians killed, hundreds wounded and civilian buildings within the vicinity destroyed. It is known as a stronghold of the Palestinian Hamas.

It is currently an Area A territory in the state of Palestine.

Economy
Khan Yunis is the second largest urban area in the Gaza Strip after Gaza City. It serves as the principal market center of the southern territory's southern half and hosts a weekly Bedouin souk ("open-air market") mostly involving local commodities.  Khan Yunis had the highest unemployment rate in the Palestinian territories.

Education
University College of Science and Technology
Al Quds open university.

Notable people
 
 
Mohammed Shabir (born 1946), former president of The Islamic University in Gaza

International relations

Twin towns – Sister cities

Khan Yunis is twinned with the following cities:
 Hamar, Norway
 Almuñécar, Spain
 Évry, France
 Bisceglie, Italy
 Alcamo, Italy

See also
 Khan Yunis massacre
Palestinian refugee camps
List of cities in Palestinian National Authority areas

References

Bibliography

External links

Khan Younis, articles from UNWRA
Welcome To The City of Khan Yunis
close-up map of Gaza
Air photo of Khan Yunis, 1946, with key to sites - Eran Laor Cartographic Collection, The National Library of Israel

 
Khan Yunis Governorate
Cities in the Gaza Strip
Caravanserais in the State of Palestine
Populated places established in the 1380s
14th-century establishments in the Mamluk Sultanate
Municipalities of the State of Palestine